Peterson Hill is an Indian drama television series, which aired on Sab TV and premiered on 26 January 2015. The series ended on 26 June 2015, due to low TRPs.

Cast
Rohit Roy as Kishorilal Chadda / Jaggu
Sucheta Khanna as Pinky Chadda
Ashwin Mushran as Peterson
Mansi Srivastava as Shatabdi/Khusbu Joshi
Samiksha Bhatnagar as Jwala Joshi
Winy Tripathi as Raju guide
Abbas Khan as Nawab
Harsh Khurana as Rahul Cheater/ Chor
Manisha Marzara as Kamini
Rakesh Srivastav as Tyagiji Hawaldar Anil Tyagi
Anup Upadhyay as Chadha Lal's Tau/Taoji/Tauji
Sunil Kumar as Choteram
 Yogesh Tripathi as Bara Ram
 Navnindra Bhel as Simi Chadda (Dadi) Kishorilal Chadda's Mother
 Pratham Shetty as Tony's Brother
 Manisha Marzara as Kamini
 Sanjay Chaudhary as Chadhalal Pilot Singh
 Ishtiyak Khan as Tinda Ram
 Swati Das as Rani Bhikaran
 Tanuj Vyasas Pushtak Pandey
 Aditya Singh Rajput as Tony
 Sushil Parashar as Tony's Father
 Abhay Singh as Negetive

References

2015 Indian television series debuts
Hindi-language television shows
Television shows set in Mumbai
Sony SAB original programming